Polly Pocket is an American Canadian 2D-animated adventure fantasy children's television series based on Mattel's doll of the same name. It features Polly having a magical locket that allows her and her friends to shrink down to tiny sizes.

Originally produced by Mattel Television and WildBrain Studios for Family Channel in Canada, the series has since aired on Universal Kids and Netflix in the United States with most of the episodes also appearing via its dedicated user handle on YouTube. From the second season to date, website sources also reveal that the series was picked up for television and/or streaming broadcast in over 12 countries and territories worldwide.

Broadcast
The show's first season premiered on Family Channel in Canada and on Netflix in the United States on July 8, 2018 and May 1, 2020 and on American television via Universal Kids on July 1, 2019, with the latter airing the second season to air alongside it back-to-back. On June 13, 2019, WildBrain announced a second season in development with Mattel  with children's media-focused publication, The Toy Book, revealing on October 20, 2020 that Mattel and WildBrain renewed the series for more episodes without stating whether it was for a new season or not; the show's second season was released on Netflix on November 15, 2020. From third season season to date, the series moved permanently to Netflix but still retained the free episode access on YouTube. The third season, as Polly Pocket: Rainbow Funland Adventures premiered on September 29, 2021 and January 9, 2022 in equal halves of episodes and the fourth season, as Polly Pocket: Summer of Adventure, was released on April 1, 2022 and August 1, 2022 – all on Netflix in the U.S.

Cast

Main
 Emily Tennant as Polly Pocket – An 11-year-old kid genius with a thirst for adventure and wants to help people. She fell on the Earth and inherited her locket from her grandmother Penelope Pocket.
 David A. Kaye as Pierce Gregory Pocket – Polly's 16-to-17-year-old brother. It is revealed he does KerPow, in episode 6, and that he works for store owner Peanut as delivery boy-turned-assistant manager in episode 10. He owns a hedgehog named Blossom. Polly and Pierce seem to grow closer following the revelation of the Pocket Locket. Pierce gets ready to go to college at Cosmopolitan City University in season 4.
 Shannon Chan-Kent as Lila Draper – Polly's fashion savvy friend of Scottish descent who often exclaims using fashion terms and pieces. She loves fashion and finds that shrinking can be chic. She starts learning KerPow the series' starting with the second season.
 Kazumi Evans (seasons 1 and 2) and Cherlandra Estrada (seasons 3 and 4) as Shani Smith – An African-American science fiction nerd who formerly had stage fright, Shani serves as the peacekeeper and brains of the group. Her favorite show is "Y-Girls" and she is a follower of Nicolas' vlog.
 Vincent Tong as Nicolas "Nic" Wells – A boy in Polly's class who attempts to investigate the paranormal. In the mid-season finale, he discovers the girls' secret, but in episode 11, he becomes the posse's fourth member and Polly's male best friend when he helps them thwart Griselle, and Gwen's plot to be mayor and take over the town and promising to keep the girls' secret safe.
 Rhona Rees as Duchess Bella "Big" Bigowski – Lila's KerPow rival-turned-friend who appears in season 2 who joins the posse as its fifth member. It was revealed that Bella comes from nobility, with her title being Duchess. Known to say, "Gym shorts".
 Advah Soudak as Hamal

Recurring
 Ellen Kennedy as Penelope Pocket – Polly's grandmother and the previous bearer of the Pocket Locket. She marries Richard in season 3.
 Maryke Hendrikse as Pamela Pocket, Polly's mother, and Paxton Pocket, Polly's baby brother who was the only one of Polly's relatives other than Grandma Penelope that knows Polly's secret until the end of season 3 and starts going to Le Fancy Pants Preschool beginning with season 4.
 Ian Hanlin as Peter Pocket, Polly's father, and Austin Summers, Pierce's friend
 Terry Klassen (season 2) and Dhirendra (seasons 3-4) as Richard – A man Penelope Pocket befriends and becomes romantically involved, getting married in season 3. He later becomes aware of the Pocket family secret in season 4.
 Rhona Rees as Prudence Pocket – The ancestor of Penelope and Polly Pocket. She discovered various colors of Pockite - purple (shrinking and growing), green (transports between worlds), orange (shapeshift), and blue (shields).
 Patricia Drake as Griselle Grande – A 60-year-old woman from England, she was Penelope's college roommate who discovered the Pocket Locket's abilities from Penelope and tried to take it from them. The two fought but broke the locket, making Griselle win it after the two went their separate ways. She spent years using her science to replicate its powers but failed, until the day when she discovered Polly Pocket had found it and reactivated its powers. She and Gwen now try to take the locket to conquer Littleton by shrinking its citizens and trapping them in a model city called "Grandeville". She eventually gets arrested at the end of episode 13 (11 in production order), after her plan to become the town's new mayor, steal Polly's locket, and shrink the town while covering it in an energy bubble failed, and Nicholas helped Lila and Shani expose Griselle's secret plans to the world. But after doing community service, she resumes her hunt for the locket while also wanting revenge on Polly and her friends, starting with episode 15 onwards. She and Gwen do not appear in later season of the series.
 Rhona Rees as Gwen Grande – Griselle Grande's granddaughter and Polly's rival-turned-friend, Polly's rival inside and outside of school. In the series' 7th episode, "Con Job", she actually helps the girls escape to avoid Griselle ruining their one day off from Polly-hunting. She and her grandmother do not appear in later seasons of the series.
 Kathleen Barr as Grunwalda Grande – The Irish ancestor of Griselle and Gwen Grande.
 Maryke Hendrikse as Melody – A teenage pop singer who becomes the girls' ally in episode 2 when she is rescued by Polly via her locket. After the two-part pilot, she doesn't reappear until the season 3 finale.
 Tabitha St. Germain as CJ, Lila's friend, Melissa Militant, a strict girl scout troop leader who does things in a military boot camp fashion, and Darlene D'Cornia
 Shannon Chan-Kent as Cheryl
 Ian Hanlin as Peanut – A restaurant owner known for making cupcakes. Pierce Pocket works for him as his delivery boy, and later, his assistant manager in the series' 11th episode.
 Kathleen Barr as Tori (Tanisha), Shani's older cousin and Belladonna Bigowski, Bella's grandmother and namesake, her father's mother and matriarch of the Bigowski family.
 Vincent Tong as Major Kisser
 Peter Kelamis as Nathaniel D'Cornia, owner of Rainbow Funland, and Mr. Quidnunc
 Sam Vincent as Officer McPherson
 Michael Daingerfield as Mr. Moneyweather
 Maryke Hendrikse as Ms. Mense
 Shannon Chan-Kent as Sun, a spa manager, and Brandon, a boy Lila helps teach Kerpow to, and Fatima
 Scott McNeil as Principal Mondo – The elementary school's quirky, eccentric but fairly strict principal.
 Nicole Oliver as Miss Fuss, a substitute teacher at Polly's school, and Ms. Demeter
 Chiara Zanni as Blair Delaware – A social media star that Lila has admiration for.
 Cherlandra Estrada as Mrs. Smith, Shani's mother; Ms. Verite; Dr. Laguna, a biologist at the Littleton Aquarium.
 Kelly Sheridan as Maxine Morningside, a news reporter, and Margot Monrovia
 Emily Tennant as Magicianna
 Kiomi Pyke as Ava
 Paul Dobson as Mr. Bigowski, Bella's father, and Lord Edward, Belladonna's assistant.
 Diana Kaarina as Mrs. Bigowski – Bella's mother.
 Cecilia Bigowski - Big's great aunt.
 Alexandra Quispe as Ricki Roller, a former rival of Pamela Pocket, and Jordan
 Ingrid Nilson as Coco and Vera Draper – Lila's baby twin sisters.
 Mark Hildreth as Mr. Draper – The father of Lila, Coco and Vera.
 Mayumi Yoshida as Grandmaster Khan – Lila and Bella's Kerpow teacher.
 Annie Chen as Hazel – Grandmaster Khan's young granddaughter. She learns of Polly's Locket and promises not to tell.
 Alvin Sanders as Marvin – The stubborn director of the Littleton Games.
 Rebecca Husain as Ice Cream Irene – a teenager who serves ice cream at the Littleton Games who Polly lets in on her secret.
 Maria J. Cruz as Consuela Fargo – A woman from Animal Control.
 Nicole Anthony as Sunny Moon – An athletic woman who competes in the Littleton Games. She specializes in many sports, including volleyball and basketball among others.
 Brenda Crichlow as Principal Snootykins – Head of Le Fancy Pants Preschool.
 Jesse Inocalla as Jethro, a teacher at Le Fancy Pants Preschool and Sam
 Brian Drummond as Bigfoot, A resident of Area Fifty-None, and Bill, A bat creature.
 Ian James Corlett as Fred – A Leprechaun.
 Ashleigh Ball as Rosie – A small alien from Pluto.
 Aria DeMaris as Carmen
 Genevieve - An alien turtle friend of Aesop.
 Nicole Anthony as Frances - A tooth fairy-in-training; Monroe - a mermaid
 Kira Tozer as Dr. Merriweather
 Adam Nurada as Benedict Cobb
 Erin Mathews as Audrey
 Marco Grazzini as Matteo, an old rival of Richard's.
 Mermaid Queen, Monroe's mother and ruler of the Mermaid Kingdom.
 Queen Madelyn, a mermaid who know Prudence Pocket.

Villains
 Kathleen Barr as Barb Payne - The villain of The Con Job who is a former actress who is angry at her co-star, Rocco Sage, for being cast in a movie after Barb was cut out from the movie. She kidnaps Rocco and ties her to a missile, hoping she would die if the missile failed to launch. Shani tries to reason with Barb, but she is not convinced and doesn't believe her. She later is arrested.
 Tabitha St. Germain as Paranormal Patty - A paranormal investigator whose only appearance so far is in "Pocket Poltergeist" when Pierce, believing to have been haunted by a ghost calls her in, unaware it was the Pocket Posse pulling a prank. Aside from her equipment almost ratting out Polly's secret, she tried to destroy the Pocket house in an attempt to get rid of the ghost before Polly arranged for her and Pierce to "banish" it, (really Shani via voice-acting and special effects), with a spirit dance.
 Jason Michas as Devin – A teenage kid who thinks he is the king of the advanced bowl. He is first seen in the episode Brotherly Love. Devin thinks that Polly and the other young kids should stay in the kid bowl but Polly doesn't like his idea, so they decide to have a skate off.
 Mr. Scheeman – A shady businessman who conned Nicolas into journeying to Almost Dead-Man's Island, hoping the boy's vlog would spread rumors about a haunted temple and keep competing businesses from taking root there. His magnet crane caused Polly's powers to glitch until Shani found and disabled it. He stole a sample of genuine "Bigfoot" hair from Nic until Shani stole it back in secret.
 Tosca Hopkins as Carla Carson – Helpmate to Mr. Scheeman
 Emily Tennant as Ruth
 Travis Turner as Augustus
 Shannon Chan-Kent as Cordelia
 Brian Doe as Chad
 Ian Hanlin as Squid Lord, an enemy of the Mermaid Kingdom

Pets
Farley – Darlene's pet ferret.
Ian Hanlin as Stella – Penelope Pocket's pet parrot.
Sir Harry – Belladonna's pet Sphynx cat.
Peaches – Polly's pet dog.
Bonita – Lila's pet rabbit.
Captain Colliwoggles – Shani's pet cat.
Brian Drummond as Aesop – Shani's pet turtle.
Galloshky – Gwen's pet rat.
Thunder – one of Hazel's five pet hamsters.
Foot – Sunny Moon's pet rabbit.
Apple - A three-legged dog Bella adopts.
Freddie - A terrier Penelope adopts.

Episodes

Series overview

Season 1 (2018)

Season 2 (2020) 
From this season onwards, episodes were released on Netflix in the United States, although they aired on linear television via Universal Kids there. This season also saw the series picked up for linear/streaming broadcast in over 12 countries and territories globally. They were also made available via its dedicated user handle on YouTube.

Season 3 (2021–22) 
The Family Channel in Canada and Universal Kids in the U.S. ceased broadcasting the series from this season onwards.

Season 4 (2022) 
The first half of this season got officially released on 1 April 2022 on Netflix U.S., while the second half was released on 1 August 2022.

Notes

References

External links
 Production website
 

2010s American animated television series
2018 American television series debuts
2010s Canadian animated television series
2018 Canadian television series debuts
American children's animated action television series
American children's animated adventure television series
American children's animated comedy television series
American children's animated fantasy television series
Canadian children's animated action television series
Canadian children's animated adventure television series
Canadian children's animated comedy television series
Canadian children's animated fantasy television series
English-language Netflix original programming
Family Jr. original programming
Universal Kids original programming
Television series about size change
Television series about revenge
Television series by DHX Media
Television series by Mattel Creations
Animated television series about children
Film and television memes